Adimali  is a town in the Idukki district of Kerala, India. National Highway 185 (NH 185) is a highway in India running from Adimali to Kumily through Kattappana and ends in Adoor in Kerala.
Adimaly is located on the National Highway 49, now NH 85, known as Kochi-Dhanushkodi National Highway , earlier known as the Kochi Madhura Highway (India) connecting Kochi and Madurai (or the old Alwaye Munnar road), India. From Adimaly, it is only 27 kilometers to Munnar, which is a famous hill station. The waterfalls Cheeyappara, Adimali waterfalls and Valara are located nearby. Pepper and cocoa cultivation is the main agricultural activity of this place. The Ponmudi Dam (294 meter length) was constructed in 1963 across the Panniar river, nearly 15 km southeast of Adimali, on the way to Rajakkad.Thopramkudy  is the nearest town. Adimali is known for its proximity to Munnar and natural environment. Adimali has almost all the basic facilities like roads, super markets, markets, educational institutions and hospitals.

The former name of the Adimali area was Mannamkandam, as the name indicates the Mannan tribe once populated the area. Other tribal groups collectively called the Muthuvan were also living in Adimali. Before 1980, the main crops under cultivation were rice as well as pepper and cardamom. Now almost 90 percent of the paddy fields have been modified for other purposes such as residential land, rubber plantations or banana fields.

History
Adimali is a relatively new town located between Kochi and Munnar. It gained its importance when the Government of Kerala allowed mass settlements of people from the neighboring districts in the Mid 20th century. The majority of the people in area around Adimali migrated from the nearby district of Ernakulam and Kottayam. Since it intersects two major roads and is a popular resting point on the way to Munnar, Adimali slowly grew in size. In the last 15 years, Adimali has emerged as a major population center in the district.

Adimaly is a small town in Idukki district of Kerala state, India. It is part of Idukki township. Adimaly is located on the National Highway 49 connecting Kochi and Madurai. Munnar -a hill station- is about 30 km from Adimaly. The Cheeyappara and Valara waterfalls are located en route to Adimaly. Pepper is the major cultivation in this area. Kallarkutti dam, which is constructed across the Muthirappuzha River, is about 9.5km from Adimali, on the way to panikkankudi. The dam was constructed in 1961 as the part of Neriamangalam hydro electric project. Ponmudi Dam, which is constructed across the Panniar river, is about 15 km from Adimali, on the way to Rajakkad. The dam which was built in 1963 has a length of 294 m. The places nearby to this area are Kuthirayalla, Pettimudi, and Maankulam. Pettimudi area is near to Tamil Nadu.

Adimali for decades served as a commercial hub for many smaller towns nearby such as Kunjithanny, Anachal, Rajakkad, Shanthanpara, Vellathooval, Murikkassery, Thopramkudi, Panikkankudi, Kallarkutti etc. However, the reliance on Adimali by these smaller towns faded during the years due to development of adequate roads and other infrastructure, few have emerged as self-reliant commercial townships.

Geography
Adimaly is located in an area with several waterfalls, valleys and hills. It is known for its pepper and cardamom plantations. The area also has a few dams and adjoining man-made reservoirs.

Cheeyappara Waterfall
The rapids of Cheeyappara descend from a height of about 1000 feet, churning with force onto 13 rock slabs in the vicinity of a bridge on National Highway 49. It is one of the few waterfalls one can view from the bottom, standing so close to the water. Next to the falls, there is a designated bathing area.

Valara Waterfall
Valara Waterfall is another 1 kilometer from Cheeyapara waterfall en route to Adimaly. One of the tributaries of The Periyar River cascades steeply from the top of a hill to a depth of about 200 feet, into a gorge.

Adimaly Waterfall

Near the centre of Adimali township, an eponymous waterfall has become an attraction and landmark, accessible from the town.

Climate 
Adimaly generally has a cool climate throughout the year, typical of the higher altitudes, though not as cold as Munnar. Temperatures rarely exceed 26 degrees and never drop below 10 degrees as it usually stays around 17-24 degrees. Though December–January are comparatively cooler than other months. Adimaly is a place with heavy rainfall mostly throughout the year and it is heaviest during the June–September season of southwest monsoon. Rains in Adimaly sometimes continue for hours or even days without any dry spell, which may bring the town to a standstill.
New residents frequently relocate to Adimaly, owing to its atmosphere and surroundings. This is evident considering the abrupt increase in population both within the town and nearby areas in the recent past.

Notable people
Maina Umaiban, Malayalam language writer and academic.

Nearby Places 
 Munnar
 Kallarkutty
 Kambilikandam
 Pullukandam
 Parathode
 Panickankudi
 vellathooval
 Konnathady
 Murickassery 
 Koompanpara
  Muniyara

References

Cities and towns in Idukki district
Tourist attractions in Idukki district